Federica Trota is an Italian wheelchair curler.

Teams

References

External links 

Living people
1968 births
Italian female curlers
Italian wheelchair curlers